Guntra Kuzmina is a Latvian singer and member of the group Borowa MC.

References 

Year of birth missing (living people)
Living people
21st-century Latvian women singers